Moola Venkata Rangaiah was an Indian film producer, known for his works in Telugu cinema, and Tamil cinema. He was the co-owner Vauhini Studios, along with his father Moola Narayana Swamy, which became one of the largest production companies in South Asia at that time.

Background
After the death of Narayana Swamy died in 1950, In 1961, B.Nagi Reddy acquired Vauhini Studios, and later renamed it to Vijaya Vauhini Studios.

References

Telugu film producers
Year of birth missing
People from Anantapur district
Film producers from Andhra Pradesh
2004 deaths